On 15 August 2016, a suicide bombing that targeted a packed Syrian rebel junction at the Atmeh border crossing, killed 50 Syrian rebels, several civilians, and reports of 2 wounded Turkish soldiers. The attack was claimed by Islamic State, that stated it targeted Syrian rebel fighters from Faylaq al-Sham and Harakat Nour al-Din al-Zenki. Around 32 dead fighters were from the Nour al-Din al-Zenki group.

Attack 
A bus transporting rebel fighters was completely destroyed in the targeted blast, causing 40 deaths and 50 injuries. The Free Syrian Army rebel factions were preparing a mobilization from the Turkish border towards the Aleppo Front to either battle the Syrian Army or Islamic State.

References 

Mass murder in 2016
ISIL terrorist incidents in Syria
Terrorist incidents in Syria in 2016
Idlib Governorate in the Syrian civil war
Suicide bombings in Syria
August 2016 events in Syria
August 2016 crimes in Asia